Ed Smith (born 1956) is an American sculptor and printmaker. Smith is a member of the National Academy of Design, a Guggenheim Fellow in Sculpture and Drawing, and a former Associate Member of the Royal Society of Sculptors. Smith’s work is based on mythology.

References 
 https://edsmithfineart.com/
 Smith, Ed. A Grand Battle, Songs of Heroism: A Suite of Sculptures by Ed Smith. Marist College Art Gallery, 2000.
 https://www.marist.edu/communication-arts/faculty/ed-smith
 https://www.rutlandherald.com/the-magnificence-of-humankind-bronze-sculptures-of-ed-smith/article_80879eb4-fd1b-5228-9d68-cb87e6b361df.html
 https://www.marist.edu/-/news-forms-and-figures-exhibition-by-professor-ed-smith

Living people
1956 births
20th-century American sculptors
20th-century American male artists
20th-century printmakers
Royal British Society of Sculptors